The fifth World Chess Championship was held in New York City (games 1–8), Philadelphia (games 9–11), and Montreal (games 12–19), and was contested between March 15 and May 26, 1894. Holder William Steinitz lost his title to challenger Emanuel Lasker, who was 32 years his junior.

Buildup
Reigning World Champion Steinitz publicly spoke of retiring; Lasker challenged him, and he changed his mind. Initially Lasker wanted to play for $5,000 a side and a match was agreed at stakes of $3,000 a side, but Steinitz agreed to a series of reductions when Lasker found it difficult to raise the money, and the final figure was $2,000 each, which was less than for some of Steinitz's earlier matches (the final combined stake of $4,000 would be worth about $495,500 at 2007 values). Although this was publicly praised as an act of sportsmanship on Steinitz's part, Steinitz may have desperately needed the money.

Results
The first player to win ten games would be champion.

Lasker won the Championship.

Steinitz had previously declared he would win without doubt, so it came as a shock when Lasker won the first game. Steinitz responded by winning the second, and was able to maintain the balance until the sixth. However, Lasker won all the games from the seventh to the 11th. When the match resumed in Montreal, Steinitz looked in better shape and won the 13th and 14th games. Lasker struck back in the 15th and 16th, and Steinitz was unable to compensate for his losses in the middle of the match. Hence Lasker won with ten wins, five losses and four draws. Some commentators thought Steinitz's habit of playing "experimental" moves in serious competition was a major factor in his downfall.

References

External links
Source
 Preview in the New York Times, Mar 11 1894 (pdf file)

1894
1894 in chess
1894 in American sports
1894 in Canadian sports
Chess in the United States
Chess in Canada
Sports competitions in New York City
Sports competitions in Montreal